Legion of the Damned is the first novel in the Legion of the Damned series by William C. Dietz. Legion of the Damned is a science fiction novel, first published by Ace Books in 1993.
This is the first novel in the nine book Legion of the Damned series. The final novel (A Fighting Chance) was released in November 2011.
Subsequent to A Fighting Chance, Dietz published a Legion of the Damned prequel series that includes Andromeda’s Fall, which was released in late 2012, Andromeda’s Choice which was published in 2013, and Andromeda’s War--which came out in late 2014.

Plot summary
In the far future, the Human Empire has been attacked by the alien Hudatha, and humanity's last hope lies with the Legion (the successor to the French Foreign Legion), an elite fighting force composed of humans and cyborgs.
When a patient is terminally ill, or a criminal receives the death penalty, they have one last chance to survive. And that's to join the Legion and become a cyborg.
Both more and less than human, these soldiers are the most elite fighting force in the Empire.

Reception
Sandra Scholes wrote of the storyline that, “Dietz sticks to what he is good at, the tactics, fight scenes and endless battles,” adding that he combines, “gritty and realistic life concepts with the guns and ammo that goes with them.” Publishers Weekly wrote that book is, “exciting and suspenseful … The humanity of the characters mixes well with the action to give this space drama real punch.”

See also
 French Foreign Legion
 Military science fiction

References

External links
 Publisher's Website for "Legion of the Damned"
 
 Legion of the Damned - iOS Game

1993 American novels
Ace Books books
American science fiction novels
Military science fiction novels
Cyborgs in literature